København Håndbold (Copenhagen Handball) is a Danish women's handball club from Copenhagen, Denmark. It was established in the spring of 2013. It took over the league licence from Frederiksberg IF and is playing in the Bambusa Kvindeligaen. The club won the Danish Championship for the first time in the 2017/18 season, after first winning the first leg and later the decisive DM-finals against Odense Håndbold. The year before, the team had also played in their first DM-final, after surprising results in the playoff against the favourites FC Midtjylland Håndbold.

Kits

Achievements
Danish League: 
Winner: 2018
Runners-Up: 2017
Danish Cup
Runners-up: 2017
Danish Super Cup:
Winner: 2018

Team

Squad
Squad for the 2022–23 season
 

Goalkeepers 
 1  Katharina Filter  
 14  Anne Christine Bossen
 16  Siri Yde
Wingers
LW
 3  Louise Føns
 7  Emilie Ytting Pedersen 
 24  Fie Woller
RW
 5  Clara Skøtt
 34  Andrea Hansen
Line players
 10  Pernille Brandenborg 
 18  Maria Lykkegaard (c)
 21  Sofia Hvenfelt 

Back players 
LB
 4  Kim Molenaar 
 8  Karoline Lund
 22  Stine Jørgensen
CB
 15  Emma Navne
 23  Silje Brøns Petersen (c)
RB
 28  Clara Skyum Thomsen

Technical staff
 Head Coach: Rasmus Overby
 Assistant coach: Mikkel Thomassen
 Goalkeeping trainer: Marie Møller
 Team Leader: Mie Albertsen
 Team Leader: Line Bitsch Jensen
 Physiotherapist: Line Knutzon
 Physical trainer: Kasper Danborg

Transfers
Transfers for the season 2023-24

 Joining
  Helene Kindberg (RB) (from  Silkeborg-Voel KFUM)
  Bianca Schanssema (GK) (from  HV Quintus)

 Leaving
  Christina Wildbork (LB) (immediately as of October 2022)
  Celine Lundbye Kristiansen (RB) (immediately as of November 2022)
  Maria Lykkegaard (P) (to  Ikast Håndbold)
  Andrea Hansen (RW) (to  Odense Håndbold)

Former notable players

  Anne Mette Hansen
  Anne Mette Pedersen
  Marianne Bonde
  Pernille Holmsgaard
  Christina Krogshede
  Christina Elm
  Mie Augustesen
  Anne Cecilie de la Cour
  Sofie Bloch-Sørensen 
  Celine Lundbye Kristiansen
  Josephine Touray
  Christina Pedersen
  Mia Møldrup
  Mai Kragballe Nielsen
  Mia Rej
  Louise Svalastog
  Stine Knudsen
  Annika Meyer
  Ine Karlsen Stangvik
  Marie Tømmerbakke
  Thea Mørk
  Line Bjørnsen
  Jenny Alm
  Linn Blohm
  Edijana Dafe 
  Marie Wall
  Myrthe Schoenaker
  Kelly Dulfer
  Debbie Bont
  Larissa Nusser
  Paulina Uścinowicz

Former coaches 
 Martin Albertsen (2013–2014)
 Reidar Møistad (2014–2016)
 Claus Mogensen (2016–)

Kit manufacturers
 Salming Sports

Arena 
Name: Frederiksberg-Hallerne
Capacity: 1,200
City: Frederiksberg, Copenhagen
Used for: HTH Ligaen
Address: Jens Jessens vej 20, 2000 Frederiksberg

Statistics

Top scorers in the EHF Champions League 
(All-Time) – Last updated on 2 October 2021

Club awards

Player of the year 
 Søs Søby (201)
 Anne Mette Hansen (2015)
 Mia Rej (2015)
 Mia Rej (2016)
 Mia Rej (2017)
 Mia Rej (2018)
 Kelly Dulfer (2019)
 Larissa Nusser (2020)

Topscorers 
 Mie Augustesen (88 goals) (2013-2014)
 Anne Mette Hansen (114 goals) (2014-2015)
 Mia Rej (92 goals) (2015-2016)
 Mia Rej (154 goals) (2016-2017)
 Mia Rej (176 goals) (2017-2018)
 Jenny Alm (133 goals) (2018-2019)
 Mia Rej (179 goals) (2019-2020)
 Larissa Nusser (124 goals) (2020-2021)

References

External links
The club's homepage 

Sports clubs in Copenhagen
Danish handball clubs
Handball clubs established in 2013
Frederiksberg Municipality
Sports teams in Copenhagen